Scopula capnosterna  is a moth of the  family Geometridae. It is found on Sulawesi.

References

Moths described in 1938
capnosterna
Moths of Indonesia